Richard "Brookes" Brooke (14 January 1927 – 29 June 2020) was an explorer and Royal Naval surveyor whose achievements included spending two winters on the British North‑East Greenland Expedition (1952–1954) and participating in Commonwealth Trans-Antarctic Expedition (TAE) (1956–1958). During the TAE he became the first person to ascend a peak (Mount Huggins) in the Royal Society Range and walked the 1600 km between Mawson Glacier and Mulock Glacier.

He was also a licensed lay reader in the Church of England in Bath, Somerset.

He died on 29 June 2020 at the age of 93.

References

1927 births
2020 deaths
British explorers
Anglican lay readers